Great Parndon is an area and former civil parish in Essex, England, that has been absorbed by the new town of Harlow and is now an electoral ward.

It had a recorded population of 18 people in 1086, rising to 41 by 1524–25. In 1622, there were 71 houses between the two parishes of Great and Little Parndon, with most names attributed to Great Parndon, given that Little Parndon was small and sparsely populated. The population of Great Parndon rose slowly from 300 in 1801 to 534 in 1891, reaching 576 in 1921, falling to 504 in 1931, then rising to 684 in 1951, by which time the building of Harlow town had begun.

It formed an ancient parish in the Harlow hundred of Essex. It was part of the Epping Poor Law Union and was within the Epping rural sanitary district. In 1894 it became part of Epping Rural District. In 1934 it gained a small part of the parish of Eastwick, Hertfordshire.

The civil parish of Great Parndon was abolished in 1955. It was mostly incorporated in the new parish and urban district of Harlow, while small areas in the south-east and south-west were transferred to Roydon, Epping Upland, and North-Weald Bassett.

References

Areas of Harlow
Former civil parishes in Essex